Christopher Skaife (born 18 December 1965) is Yeoman Warder Ravenmaster at the Tower of London.  His responsibilities include the care and feeding for the ravens of the Tower of London.

Skaife was born in Dover on 18 December 1965 and joined the British Army at the age of 18. Skaife is a retired colour sergeant and a former drum major with the Princess of Wales's Royal Regiment.

In 2011, Skaife succeeded Derrick Coyle as Ravenmaster at the Tower of London, where he is responsible for seven ravens. In 2018, he published The Ravenmaster, which The Guardian called "a wonderfully personal account of life with the ravens".

Publications

References

1965 births
20th-century British Army personnel
21st-century British Army personnel
21st-century British non-fiction writers
Ceremonial officers in the United Kingdom
English male non-fiction writers
English non-fiction writers
Living people
People from Dover, Kent
Princess of Wales's Royal Regiment soldiers
Tower of London
Military personnel from Kent